Gualaquiza Airport  is an airport serving the town of Gualaquiza in Morona-Santiago Province, Ecuador. The airport is at the entrance to a mountain valley, with nearby rising and high terrain west through north through east. The southern quadrants are open.

The Gualaquiza non-directional beacon (ident: GLZ) is located on the field.

See also

 List of airports in Ecuador
 Transport in Ecuador

References

External links
 HERE Maps - Gualaquiza
 OpenStreetMap - Gualaquiza
 OurAirports - Gualaquiza
 Skyvector - Gualaquiza

Airports in Ecuador